Samuktala Road Junction is a railway junction station in Alipurduar district in the Indian state of West Bengal.

History
With the partition of India in 1947, railway links of Assam and the Indian part of North Bengal, earlier passing through the eastern part of Bengal, were completely cut off from the rest of India. The Assam Rail Link project was taken up on 26 January 1948 and the first train ran on the route on 26 January 1950. The project was a   metre gauge line linking Fakiragram with Kishanganj. The route was converted to  broad gauge in 2003–2006.

The broad gauge line from New Jalpaiguri to Samuktala Road was added in the 1960s.

References

External links
  Trains at Samuktala Road

Alipurduar railway division
Railway stations in Alipurduar district
Railway junction stations in West Bengal